Origin (stylized in all caps) is a Japanese manga series written and illustrated by Boichi. It was serialized in Kodansha's seinen manga magazine Weekly Young Magazine from September 2016 to February 2019, with its chapters collected in ten tankōbon volumes. In 2019, Origin won the Grand Prize at the 22nd Japan Media Arts Festival.

Publication
Origin, written and illustrated by Boichi, was serialized in Kodansha's seinen manga magazine Weekly Young Magazine from September 5, 2016, to February 9, 2019. Kodansha collected its chapters in ten tankōbon volumes, released from January 6, 2017, to June 6, 2019.

During their panel at Anime NYC 2022, Kodansha USA announced that they licensed the manga for a Fall 2023 release.

Volume list

Reception
Origin won the Grand Prize of the Manga Division at the 22nd Japan Media Arts Festival in 2019.

References

External links
 

Action anime and manga
Kodansha manga
Science fiction anime and manga
Seinen manga